The first election to Antrim County Council took place in April 1899 as part of that year's Irish local elections.

Aggregate results

Ward results

Cushendall

Ahoghill

Galgorm

Killoquin

Glenarm

Antrim

Portrush

Kells

Ballyclare

Carrickfergus

References

County Antrim
1899